Kelly Marie Tran (born Loan Tran, January 17, 1989) is an American actress. She began acting in 2011, with most of her roles being in short film and television. She came to global prominence for her role as Rose Tico in the Star Wars sequel trilogy films The Last Jedi (2017) and The Rise of Skywalker (2019). She also voiced Princess Raya in the Disney film Raya and the Last Dragon (2021) and Dawn Betterman in the DreamWorks Animation film The Croods: A New Age (2020).

Early life
Kelly Marie Tran was born on January 17, 1989, in San Diego, California. Her parents were refugees from Vietnam who fled the country following the Vietnam War. As a child, her father was homeless and grew up on the streets of Vietnam. After moving to the United States, her father worked at Burger King to support the family, and her mother worked at a funeral home.

Tran attended Westview High School in San Diego and worked at a yogurt shop to earn money for head shots. Tran then graduated from UCLA with a B.A. in communications.

Career

2011–2014: Early work
Tran's early credits consisted of primarily CollegeHumor videos and small TV roles. She landed a commercial agent in 2011, who got Tran to take improv classes at the Upright Citizens Brigade. At The Second City, Tran is part of the all-female, Asian-American improv group, Number One Son.

In 2013, she starred in the web series Ladies Like Us. In 2015, Tran was working as an assistant at a creative recruiting firm in Century City.

2015–2019: Star Wars and mainstream success 
In 2015, Tran was cast as Rose Tico in Star Wars: The Last Jedi. Rose Tico is a rebel mechanic who joins up with main character Finn after the sacrifice of her oldest sister, Paige Tico (Veronica Ngo), a gunner trained by Resistance commander Poe Dameron. When she went to shoot her scenes in England in early 2016, she was required to keep her role secret, so she told her family she was making an independent film in Canada. The Last Jedi made Tran the first Asian-American woman to have a major role in a Star Wars film. In 2017, she also became the first woman of Asian descent to appear on the cover of Vanity Fair when she appeared on the cover of the summer 2017 issue with actor John Boyega (who played Finn) and Oscar Isaac (who played X-wing fighter pilot Poe Dameron).

Tran plays the lead role of Kaitlin Le in Radiotopia's mystery thriller podcast Passenger List. She was a series regular on the Facebook Watch series Sorry for Your Loss.

2020–present 
Tran voiced Raya in the Walt Disney Animation Studios production Raya and the Last Dragon, replacing Cassie Steele.
Tran was set to voice Val Little in the Disney+ series Monsters at Work, but was replaced by Mindy Kaling. She has also been cast as Dawn in the film The Croods: A New Age, replacing Kat Dennings.

Tran is an executive producer on Jeremy Workman's 2021 documentary Lily Topples the World, which follows 21-year-old domino toppling artist Lily Hevesh. The documentary premiered to critical acclaim at the 2021 South by Southwest Film Festival, where it won the Grand Jury Prize for Best Documentary.

Tran is also an executive producer of the spoken-word poetry ensemble film Summertime, marking her second collaboration with Raya and the Last Dragon director Carlos López Estrada. Tran and Estrada announced that they were establishing a new production company called Antigravity Academy in November 2022, intending to help produce entertainment from and about people from historically excluded communities.

Upcoming projects 
Tran will next star in Tayarisha Poe's second feature film, The Young Wife, alongside Kiersey Clemons, and in Me, Myself & The Void. She is also currently developing a biopic about civil rights activist and her close friend Amanda Nguyen.

Personal life
After the release of Star Wars: The Last Jedi in December 2017, Tran became the subject of racist and sexist attacks over the Internet, including insults about her ethnicity and size. She was the target of racist trolling on Twitter; in one example, Internet personality Paul Ray Ramsey mocked her size. Her character Rose Tico's entry on Wookieepedia, an online encyclopedia about the Star Wars universe, was edited by internet trolls to include racist and vulgar comments, which drew national media attention. Fandom, the wiki hosting service that operated the domain, removed the offensive edits, protected the page, and publicly condemned the vandalism. 

After months of online harassment, Tran deleted all of her Instagram posts in June 2018, and replaced the account bio with, "Afraid, but doing it anyway." She also pursued therapy following the harassment. Subsequently, several cast and crew members of The Last Jedi condemned the attacks and spoke out in defense of Tran, including writer-director Rian Johnson and actors John Boyega, Domhnall Gleeson, and Mark Hamill, who posted a picture of himself with Tran and wrote the caption, "What's not to love? #GetALifeNerds". Johnson branded the attackers as "manbabies", and said they represent a "few unhealthy people" and not the "vast majority" of Star Wars fans. Other celebrities voiced support for Tran as well, including Stephen Colbert, Josh Gad, Kumail Nanjiani, Gabrielle Union, Elijah Wood, and Edgar Wright. In less than one day, more than 20,000 fans retweeted a message of support for Tran from a fan on Twitter that sought to "drown out the manbabies". She was also shown support at the 2018 San Diego Comic-Con during a "Rally for Rose", where fans appeared in cosplay attire as her Star Wars character Rose Tico or wore "Rose for Hope" T-shirts. Fans posted about the event on social media using the hashtags #ForceOutHate and #RallyForRose. At Star Wars Celebration in April 2019, Tran received a standing ovation from fans, causing her to tear up at the reception.

In August 2018, Tran penned an essay on the subject for The New York Times entitled "Kelly Marie Tran: I Won't Be Marginalized by Online Harassment". She described how the matter made her self-conscious, writing that the attacks reinforced the ones she had long faced as a Vietnamese-American, and which sought to reinforce a narrative that Asians should be marginalized and treated only as minor characters, both in stories and in real life. Tran further wrote that the ordeal reached a point where she began to believe the negative remarks about her, stating that they had sent her "down a spiral of self-hate, into the darkest recesses of my mind, places where I tore myself apart, where I put their words above my own self-worth." She concluded with, "You might know me as Kelly. I am the first woman of color to have a leading role in a Star Wars movie. I am the first Asian woman to appear on the cover of Vanity Fair. My real name is Loan. And I am just getting started." Tran later said the essay was difficult to write, but also "probably one of the proudest moments of [her] career thus far."

Filmography

Film

Television

Awards and nominations

References

External links

1989 births
Living people
21st-century American actresses
Actresses from San Diego
American film actresses
American television actresses
American voice actresses
American people of Vietnamese descent
Upright Citizens Brigade Theater performers
University of California, Los Angeles alumni
Victims of cyberbullying
Actresses of Vietnamese descent
21st-century American comedians